Natalie Nassar (born November 30, 1981) is an American voice actress for ADV Films. As such, she has been known in Pani Poni Dash! as the brainy student Miyako Uehara and in Coyote Ragtime Show for voicing the Criminal Guild assassin, March.

Anime roles
 Coyote Ragtime Show - March
 Pani Poni Dash! - Miyako Uehara

External links
 Natalie Nassar at the CrystalAcids Anime Voice Actor Database
 
 

1981 births
Living people
American voice actresses
Actresses from Houston
21st-century American women